Local elections in Caloocan were held on May 13, 2013 within the Philippine general election. The voters elected for the elective local posts in the city: the mayor, vice mayor, the two Congressmen, and the councilors, six in each of the city's two legislative districts.

Mayoral and vice mayoral election
Mayor Enrico Echiverri was term-limited and ineligible for reelection, he chose to seek congressional comeback. His son League of the Barangay National President RJ Echiverri was his party's nominee. RJ ran under Liberal Party with his running mate Former Vice Mayor Luisito "Luis Tito" Varela who served as vice mayor from 2001 to 2010.

First District Representative Oscar Malapitan, was term-limited and ineligible for reelection. He announced his bid in mayoralty race under the UNA and his running mate was businessman Antonio "Nani" Almeda.

Other mayoralty candidates were former Mayor Macario Asistio, Jr. who became mayor from 1988 until 1995 and Diony Guillarte.

Other vice-mayoralty candidates were former Mayor Reynaldo "Rey" Malonzo, who became vice-mayor of the city from 1992 until 1995 then mayor from 1995 until 2004, First Councilor Luis Macario "Maca" Asistio who ran under PMP and Mariano Yu.

Congressional Election

First District Representative Oscar Malapitan was term-limited and he chose mayoral race instead. His son, First District Councilor Dale Gonzalo "Along" Malapitan ran for his place instead, under UNA. He was challenged by Mayor Enrico "Recom" Echiverri of Liberal. Other candidates include former Rep. Roberto "Bobby" Guanzon who became representative from 1995 until 1998, Maria Hernando, Milagros Libuton, Sandro Limpin, Imelda Pengson and Sirgea Villamayor.

Second District Representative Mary Mitzi "Mitch" Cajayon-Uy ran for second term.She faced prominent candidates, including former Second Rep. Luis Asistio under NPC, Vice Mayor Edgar Erice under Liberal, Carlos Cabochan of Kapatiran and independent Adoracion Garcia.

Results

Mayor
First District Rep. Oscar "Oca" Malapitan defeated Liga President Ricojudge Janvier "RJ" Echiverri, son of Mayor Enrico "Recom" Echiverri.

Vice mayoral election
Second District Councilor Luis Macario "Maca" Asistio defeated former Vice Mayor Luisito "Luis Tito" Varela.

For Representatives

First District 
Mayor Enrico "Recom" Echiverri defeated Councilor Dale Gonzalo "Along" Malapitan with a margin of 12,756 votes.

Second District 
Rep. Mary Mitzi "Mitch" Cajayon-Uy was defeated by Vice Mayor Edgar "Egay" Erice.

For City Councilors

Administration coalition (Team RJ)

Primary opposition coalition (Team Oca)

First District 

|-bgcolor=black
|colspan=5|

Second District 

|-bgcolor=black
|colspan=5|

External links
 Official website of the Commission on Elections
  Official website of National Movement for Free Elections (NAMFREL)
 Official website of the Parish Pastoral Council for Responsible Voting (PPCRV)

2013 Philippine local elections
Elections in Caloocan
2013 elections in Metro Manila